John Monroe Van Vleck (March 4, 1833 – November 4, 1912) was an American mathematician and astronomer.
He taught astronomy and mathematics at Wesleyan University in Middletown, Connecticut for more than 50 years (1853-1912), and served as acting university president twice. The Van Vleck Observatory (at Wesleyan University) and the crater Van Vleck on the Moon are named after him.

Early life
John Monroe Van Vleck was born on March 4, 1833, in Stone Ridge, New York; he was the son of Peter Van Vleck (1806-1872) and Ann Hasbrouck (1803-1854). His maternal grandparents were Joseph Hasbrouck (1754-1831) and Margaret Hoornbeck Hasbrouck (1768-1831).  He graduated from Wesleyan University in 1850, and began teaching at Greenwich Academy. The degree of LL.D. was conferred on him by Northwestern University in 1876. From 1851 to 1853 he had been an assistant at the Nautical Almanac Office.

Career
He taught astronomy and mathematics at Wesleyan University in Middletown, Connecticut for more than 50 years, serving as adjunct professor of Mathematics 1853–57, professor of Mathematics and Astronomy 1858–1904, and professor emeritus 1904–12. He served as the acting president for the university on two occasions, 1872–73 and 1887–89, the vice president 1890–93.
In 1904 he was vice-president of the American Mathematical Society.

He was a member of the Connecticut Academy of Arts and Sciences.

In 1869 he was a member of the Solar Eclipse Expedition to Mount Pleasant, Iowa. He was a fellow of the A.A.A.S. His publications include "Tables giving the Positions of the Moon for 1855-'6" and for 1878–91, and similar "Tables giving the Positions of Saturn for 1857 to 1877" contributed to the "American Nautical Almanac".

Honors
The Van Vleck Observatory at Wesleyan University was named after him, as was the crater Van Vleck on the Moon.

Personal life
He was married to Ellen Maria Burr on May 2, 1854. His wife died December 26, 1899, but he lived an additional 12 years. J. M. van Vleck was survived by a son and three daughters:
Anna Van Vleck
Clara Van Vleck
Edward Burr Van Vleck (1863-1943), a leading mathematician in the United States.
Edward taught at the University of Wisconsin–Madison, where he became professor emeritus in 1926.
Jane Van Vleck

See also
 John Hasbrouck van Vleck - grandson of John Monroe Van Vleck

Notes

References
 "THE SCIENCE FACULTY 1831-1861: Department of Astronomy", Wesleyan University, 2007-12-03, webpage: WU-Fac: states "Prof., 1885-1904" but should be "1858" not 1885.
 "John Monroe Van Vleck", Virtualology (from Appletons Encyclopedia), 2001, webpage: www.famousamericans.net/johnmonroevanvleck.

1833 births
1912 deaths
People from Ulster County, New York
Wesleyan University faculty
American mathematicians
American astronomers
Wesleyan University alumni
American people of Dutch descent
American people of German descent
Mathematicians from New York (state)